ZNE may refer to:

Newman Airport (IATA: ZNE)
Zande language (ISO 639: zne)
Zero-Net-Energy; see Zero-energy building

See also
Zine, a collection of self-published work reproduced by photocopying